The 2002 Old Dominion 500 was the 32nd stock car race of the 2002 NASCAR Winston Cup Series and the 54th iteration of the event. The race was held on Sunday, October 20, 2002, before a crowd of 87,000 in Martinsville, Virginia at Martinsville Speedway, a  permanent oval-shaped short track. The race took the scheduled 500 laps to complete. At race's end, Kurt Busch, driving for Roush Racing, would come back from a dismal starting spot and spin to control the late stages of the race and win. The win was Busch's second career NASCAR Winston Cup Series victory and his second victory of the season. To fill out the podium, Johnny Benson Jr., driving for MBV Motorsports, and Ricky Rudd, driving for Robert Yates Racing, would finish second and third, respectively.

Background 

Martinsville Speedway is an NASCAR-owned stock car racing track located in Henry County, in Ridgeway, Virginia, just to the south of Martinsville. At 0.526 miles (0.847 km) in length, it is the shortest track in the NASCAR Cup Series. The track was also one of the first paved oval tracks in NASCAR, being built in 1947 by H. Clay Earles. It is also the only remaining race track that has been on the NASCAR circuit from its beginning in 1948.

Entry list 

 (R) denotes rookie driver.

Practice

First practice 
The first practice session was held on Friday, October 18, at 11:20 am EST. The session would last for two hours.

Second practice 
The second practice session was held on Saturday, October 19, at 11:15 am EST. The session would last for 45 minutes.

Third and final practice 
The final practice session, sometimes referred to as Happy Hour, was held on Saturday, October 19, at 12:30 pm EST. The session would last for 45 minutes.

Qualifying 
Qualifying was held on Friday, October 18, at 3:05 pm EST. Each driver would have two laps to set a fastest time; the fastest of the two would count as their official qualifying lap. Positions 1–36 would be decided on time, while positions 37–43 would be based on provisionals. Six spots are awarded by the use of provisionals based on owner's points. The seventh is awarded to a past champion who has not otherwise qualified for the race. If no past champ needs the provisional, the next team in the owner points will be awarded a provisional.

Five drivers would fail to qualify: Brian Rose, Carl Long, Morgan Shepherd, Ryan McGlynn, and Kirk Shelmerdine.

Full qualifying results

Race results

References 

2002 NASCAR Winston Cup Series
NASCAR races at Martinsville Speedway
October 2002 sports events in the United States
2002 in sports in Virginia